Kiss This is a "best of" compilation by the Sex Pistols released in 1992. It features all tracks from Never Mind the Bollocks, Here's the Sex Pistols''' and highlights from the soundtrack album The Great Rock 'n' Roll Swindle, interspersed with singles and B-sides.

Originally it was issued with a bonus CD featuring 21 July 1977 show at Trondheim and a foldout colour poster.

Track listing
Kiss This
"Anarchy in the U.K." (from Never Mind the Bollocks, 1977)
"God Save the Queen" (from Never Mind the Bollocks, 1977)
"Pretty Vacant" (from Never Mind the Bollocks, 1977)
"Holidays in the Sun" (from Never Mind the Bollocks, 1977)
"I Wanna Be Me" ("Anarchy in the U.K." B-side, 1976)
"Did You No Wrong" (Lydon/Matlock/Nightingale/Cook/Jones) ("God Save the Queen" Virgin B-side, 1977)
"No Fun" (Alexander/Asheton/Asheton/Osterberg) ("Pretty Vacant" B-side, 1977)
"Satellite" ("Holidays in the Sun" B-side, 1977)
"Don't Give Me No Lip, Child" (from The Great Rock n Roll Swindle, 1979)
"(I'm Not Your) Stepping Stone" (Boyce/Hart) (from The Great Rock n Roll Swindle, 1979)
"Bodies" (from Never Mind the Bollocks, 1977)
"No Feelings" (from Never Mind the Bollocks, 1977)
"Liar" (from Never Mind the Bollocks, 1977)
"Problems" (from Never Mind the Bollocks, 1977)
"Seventeen" (from Never Mind the Bollocks, 1977)
"Submission" (from Never Mind the Bollocks, 1977)
"New York" (from Never Mind the Bollocks, 1977)
"EMI (Unlimited Edition)" (from Never Mind the Bollocks, 1977)
"My Way" (Anka/Revaud/Francois/Thibaut) (from The Great Rock n Roll Swindle'', 1979)
"Silly Thing" (re-recorded single version, 1979)

Live In Trondheim 21st July 1977 
"Anarchy in the U.K."
"I Wanna Be Me"
"Seventeen"
"New York"
"EMI (Unlimited Edition)"
"No Fun"
"No Feelings"
"Problems"
"God Save the Queen"

Charts

References

1992 greatest hits albums
Sex Pistols compilation albums
Virgin Records compilation albums